The Coastal Group is a geologic group in Jamaica, that preserves fossils.

See also

 List of fossiliferous stratigraphic units in Jamaica

References
 

Geologic groups of North America
Geologic formations of Jamaica
Neogene Jamaica